Mihai-Alexandru Costea (born 29 May 1988 in Drăgășani) is a Romanian professional footballer who plays as a striker for Liga IV - Argeș County club ARO Muscelul Câmpulung. He is the younger brother of Florin Costea.

Club career

FC U Craiova

Costea played in Universitatea Craiova youth team. In 2008 the player was promoted to the first team, where he joined his older brother Florin Costea. Though his favorite positions are striker or winger, due to lack of players at Universitatea Craiova he was often used as a left midfielder. This usually brought criticism to Universitatea Craiova officials.

Steaua București 

Costea was transferred to Steaua București for a reported transfer fee of €1.4 million.

In July 2013, Costea was excluded from the team, after refusing to comply with the team schedule, being unhappy that he wasn't called for game against Vardar Skopje, in the Champions League qualifying stage.

Gulf 

In 2016, it was announced that United Arab Emirates's Al-Ittihad Kalba signed Romanian free-agent Mihai Costea. Costea concluded his debut season as the club's top scorer with 17 goals in addition to ten league assists in only eleven games played.

International career 

Costea was a Romania U-21 international being capped thirteen times and scored one goal against Latvia U-21 on 14 November 2009.

Career statistics 
(Correct as of 8 January 2016)

Honours

Club
Steaua București
 Romanian Liga I: 2012–13, 2013–14
 Romanian Supercup: 2013

Universitatea Craiova
 Romanian Liga II: 2005–06

References

External links 
 
 

1988 births
People from Drăgășani
Living people
Romanian footballers
Association football forwards
FC U Craiova 1948 players
FC Steaua București players
FC Voluntari players
Al-Ittihad Kalba SC players
Fujairah FC players
Al-Arabi SC (UAE) players
AFC Chindia Târgoviște players
Liga I players
Romanian expatriate footballers
Romania under-21 international footballers
UAE First Division League players
UAE Pro League players
Expatriate footballers in the United Arab Emirates